Aleg is the capital of the Brakna Region, Mauritania.

Background
The town includes the village of 'Elb Jmel, and the village of Lamden which is known as the birthplace of former President of Mauritania, Sidi Ould Cheikh Abdallahi.

References

Regional capitals in Mauritania
Communes of Brakna Region